The following is a list of triple tautonyms: zoological names of species consisting of three identical words (the generic name, the specific name and the subspecies have the same spelling). Such names are allowed in zoology, but not in botany, where the generic and specific epithets of a species must differ (though differences as small as one letter are permitted, as in cumin, Cuminum cyminum).

List 
Alces alces alces, the European elk
Bison bison bison, the plains bison
Bubo bubo bubo, the European eagle-owl
Bufo bufo bufo, the European toad
Buteo buteo buteo, the European buzzard
Capreolus capreolus capreolus, the European roe deer
Caracal caracal caracal, the caracal
Caretta caretta caretta, the Atlantic loggerhead sea turtle 
Crossoptilon crossoptilon crossoptilon, the Szechuan white-eared pheasant
Francolinus francolinus francolinus, the black francolin 
Gallus gallus gallus, the Cochin-Chinese red junglefowl
Giraffa giraffa giraffa, the South African giraffe
Gorilla gorilla gorilla, the western lowland gorilla
Jacana jacana jacana, the wattled jacana
Lagopus lagopus lagopus, the willow ptarmigan
Lutra lutra lutra, the European and North African variant of the Eurasian otter
Lynx lynx lynx, the Northern European lynx
Meles meles meles, the European badger
Mephitis mephitis mephitis, the Canada striped skunk
Naja naja naja, the Indian cobra
Natrix natrix natrix, the Central European variant of the grass snake
Pica pica pica, the Eurasian magpie
Quelea quelea quelea, the red-billed quelea
Rattus rattus rattus, the roof rat
Redunca redunca redunca, the Bohor reedbuck 
Rupicapra rupicapra rupicapra, the Alpine chamois
Sula sula sula, the Caribbean and Southwest Atlantic Islands variant of the red-footed booby
Vulpes vulpes vulpes, the Scandinavian red fox

See also 
List of tautonyms
List of people with reduplicated names

Notes

References

Wolpow, E. R. (1983). Triple Tautonyms in Biology. Word Ways, 16(2), 10.

Zoological nomenclature
Lists of animals